Merothrips is a genus of thrips in the family Merothripidae. There are about 19 described species in Merothrips.

Species
These 19 species belong to the genus Merothrips:

 Merothrips brevisetis Hood
 Merothrips brunneus Ward, 1969
 Merothrips cognatus Hood
 Merothrips dietrichi Schliephake
 Merothrips floridensis Watson, 1927
 Merothrips fusciceps Hood & Williams, 1915
 Merothrips indicus Bhatti & Ananthakrishnan, 1975
 Merothrips laevis Hood, 1938
 Merothrips mirus Crawford
 Merothrips morgani Hood, 1912
 Merothrips nigricornis Hood
 Merothrips plaumanni Crawford
 Merothrips productus Hood, 1938
 Merothrips tympanis Hood
 Merothrips williamsi Priesner, 1921
 Merothrips yii Ng & Mound, 2018
 Merothrips zondagi Ward, 1969
 † Merothrips balticus Ulitzka, 2015
 † Merothrips fritschi Priesner, 1924

References

Further reading

 
 
 
 

Thrips
Articles created by Qbugbot